Lochbach may refer to:

 Lochbach (Itter), a river of North Rhine-Westphalia, Germany
 a tributary of the Wyna (river), Switzerland